Ponte dell'Industria, also known as Ponte di ferro, is a bridge that connects via del Porto Fluviale to via Antonio Pacinotti, in Rome, in the neighborhoods Ostiense and Portuense.

History
It was built between 1862 and 1863 by a Belgian company to link the railway line of Civitavecchia to Roma Termini railway station. The Belgian company accomplished the work in England, then the bridge was moved in pieces to Rome, where it was mounted.

In 1911, with the opening of the new station of Trastevere, the railway line was moved to the new Ponte San Paolo, a little further upstream.

On the night of 2 October 2021 it was partially damaged by fire. On 12 December, after merely 70 days, the bridge has been repaired and opened for traffic.

Description
Built completely in metal, it has three lights in metal girders and is about 131 meters long.

Notes

Sources

Bridges in Rome
Bridges completed in 1863
Rome Q. X Ostiense
Rome Q. XI Portuense